HKTVmall is a wholly owned subsidiary of HKTV founded in 2015 as a over-the-top shopping and entertainment ("shoppertainment") platform.

History 
After HKTV's ultimately failed bid for a Hong Kong TV license, HKTV announced on 16 December 2014 that it would begin trialing its online shopping platform known as HKTVmall, to be launched on 1 February 2015.

References 

Retail companies established in 2015
Internet properties established in 2015
E-commerce
2015 establishments in Hong Kong